Eoreuma is a genus of moths of the family Crambidae.

Species
Eoreuma arenella A. Blanchard & Knudson, 1983
Eoreuma callista Klots, 1970
Eoreuma confederata Klots, 1970
Eoreuma crawfordi Klots, 1970
Eoreuma densellus (Zeller, 1881)
Eoreuma donzella Schaus, 1922
Eoreuma evae Klots, 1970
Eoreuma loftini (Dyar, 1917)
Eoreuma morbidellus (Dyar, 1913)
Eoreuma multipunctellus (Kearfott, 1908)
Eoreuma paranella Schaus, 1922

References

Haimbachiini
Crambidae genera